The Benazir Bhutto Shaheed Youth Development Program (BBSYDP) is Government of Sindh training program for young unemployed people. In 2012 46,000 people qualified to take part in the program.

Officers
Secretary: SHARIQ AHMED
Director: UZMA ISMAIL
Deputy Director (Private Sector Training Wing): MUHAMMAD FAHEEM
Manager MIS: MUHAMMAD ARSALAN ASLAM

References

External links

Vocational education in Pakistan
Memorials to Benazir Bhutto